Moissac station (French: Gare de Moissac) is a railway station in Moissac, Occitanie, France. The station is on the Bordeaux–Sète railway. The station is served by TER (local) services operated by SNCF.

Train services
The following services currently call at Moissac:
local service (TER Occitanie) Agen–Montauban–Toulouse

See also 

 List of SNCF stations in Occitanie

References

Railway stations in Tarn-et-Garonne